Elections to Belfast City Council were held on 7 June 2001 on the same day as the other Northern Irish local government elections. The election used nine district electoral areas to elect a total of 51 councillors, most representing the more heavily populated north and west.

Sinn Féin emerged as the largest party, although Jim Rodgers from the UUP became Lord Mayor.

Election results

Note: "Votes" are the first preference votes.

Districts summary

|- class="unsortable" align="centre"
!rowspan=2 align="left"|Ward
! % 
!Cllrs
! %
!Cllrs
! %
!Cllrs
! %
!Cllrs
! %
!Cllrs
! %
!Cllrs
! %
!Cllrs
!rowspan=2|TotalCllrs
|- class="unsortable" align="center"
!colspan=2 bgcolor="" | Sinn Féin
!colspan=2 bgcolor="" | UUP
!colspan=2 bgcolor="" | DUP
!colspan=2 bgcolor=""| SDLP
!colspan=2 bgcolor="" | Alliance
!colspan=2 bgcolor="" | PUP
!colspan=2 bgcolor="white"| Others
|-
|align="left"|Balmoral
|9.9
|0
|bgcolor="40BFF5"|34.7
|bgcolor="40BFF5"|2
|10.1
|1
|29.8
|2
|12.4
|1
|3.1
|0
|0.0
|0
|6
|-
|align="left"|Castle
|14.1
|1
|11.0
|1
|bgcolor="#D46A4C"|33.3
|bgcolor="#D46A4C"|2
|27.8
|2
|6.9
|0
|2.5
|0
|4.4
|0
|6
|-
|align="left"|Court
|2.8
|0
|23.1
|1
|bgcolor="#D46A4C"|34.0
|bgcolor="#D46A4C"|2
|0.0
|0
|0.0
|0
|22.0
|1
|18.1
|1
|5
|-
|align="left"|Laganbank
|16.2
|1
|26.2
|2
|8.1
|0
|bgcolor="#99FF66"|28.8
|bgcolor="#99FF66"|2
|7.6
|0
|2.6
|0
|10.5
|0
|5
|-
|align="left"|Lower Falls
|bgcolor="#008800"|80.2
|bgcolor="#008800"|4
|0.0
|0
|0.0
|0
|15.9
|0
|0.0
|0
|0.0
|0
|3.9
|0
|5
|-
|align="left"|Oldpark
|bgcolor="#008800"|46.8
|bgcolor="#008800"|3
|7.0
|0
|15.0
|1
|19.1
|1
|1.0
|0
|9.4
|1
|1.7
|0
|6
|-
|align="left"|Pottinger
|9.7
|1
|28.2
|2
|bgcolor="#D46A4C"|36.2
|bgcolor="#D46A4C"|2
|3.5
|0
|5.3
|0
|13.3
|1
|3.8
|0
|6
|-
|align="left"|Upper Falls
|bgcolor="#008800"|68.3
|bgcolor="#008800"|4
|0.0
|0
|0.0
|0
|28.5
|1
|0.9
|0
|0.0
|0
|2.3
|0
|5
|-
|align="left"|Victoria
|0.0
|0
|bgcolor="40BFF5"|36.6
|bgcolor="40BFF5"|2
|28.0
|2
|1.8
|0
|22.8
|2
|4.2
|0
|6.6
|0
|7
|- class="unsortable" class="sortbottom" style="background:#C9C9C9"
|align="left"| Total
|28.4
|14
|18.3
|11
|18.1
|10
|17.4
|9
|6.8
|3
|5.8
|3
|5.2
|1
|51
|-
|}

District results

Balmoral

1997: 2 x UUP, 2 x SDLP, 1 x Alliance, 1 x DUP
2001: 2 x UUP, 2 x SDLP, 1 x Alliance, 1 x DUP
1997-2001 Change: No change

Castle

1997: 2 x UUP, 1 x DUP, 1 x SDLP, 1 x Alliance, 1 x Sinn Féin, 
2001: 2 x DUP, 2 x SDLP, 1 x Sinn Féin, 1 x UUP
1997-2001 Change: DUP and SDLP gain from UUP and Alliance

Court

1997: 2 x UUP, 1 x DUP, 1 x PUP, 1 x UDP
2001: 2 x DUP, 1 x UUP, 1 x PUP, 1 x Independent
1997-2001 Change: DUP gain from UUP, UDP becomes Independent

Laganbank

1997: 2 x UUP, 1 x SDLP, 1 x Sinn Féin, 1 x Alliance 
2001: 2 x SDLP, 2 x UUP, 1 x Sinn Féin
1997-2001 Change: SDLP gain from Alliance

Lower Falls

1997: 4 x Sinn Féin, 1 x SDLP
2001: 4 x Sinn Féin, 1 x SDLP
1997-2001 Change: No change

Oldpark

1997: 3 x Sinn Féin, 1 x SDLP, 1 x UUP, 1 x PUP
2001: 3 x Sinn Féin, 1 x SDLP, 1 x DUP, 1 x PUP
1997-2001 Change: DUP gain from UUP

Pottinger

1997: 2 x DUP, 2 x UUP, 1 x PUP, 1 x Sinn Féin
2001: 2 x DUP, 2 x UUP, 1 x PUP, 1 x Alliance
1997-2001 Change: Sinn Féin gain from Alliance

Upper Falls

1997: 4 x Sinn Féin, 1 x SDLP
2001: 4 x Sinn Féin, 1 x SDLP
1997-2001 Change: No change

Victoria

1997: 2 x UUP, 2 x Alliance, 2 x DUP, 1 x Independent Unionist
2001: 3 x UUP, 2 x DUP, 2 x Alliance
1997-2001 Change: Independent Unionist joins UUP

References

Belfast City Council elections
Belfast